Greenwich Time may refer to:
 Greenwich Mean Time, the mean solar time at the Royal Observatory in Greenwich, London.
 Greenwich Time Signal, a time calibration service.
 Greenwich Time (newspaper), a Connecticut newspaper.
 The Greenwich Time Lady, Ruth Belville who ran a time setting business from 1892 - 1940.
 G:MT - Greenwich Mean Time, a 1999 British drama film